Les Brouzils is a commune in the Vendée department in the Pays de la Loire region in western France. Its coat of arms has a wolf, which symbolizes bravery.

See also
Communes of the Vendée department

References

Communes of Vendée